Galathea intermedia is a species of squat lobster found in the north-eastern Atlantic Ocean, as far north as Troms, Norway, south to Dakar and the Mediterranean Sea.

The whole body is red, with a beige stripe along the back, onto the narrow rostrum. The limbs are semitransparent, and the animal bears several "neon blue" spots on the front of the body that may serve in species recognition.

References

Squat lobsters
Crustaceans of the Atlantic Ocean
Crustaceans described in 1851